Mark Travers (born 18 May 1999) is an Irish professional footballer who plays as a goalkeeper for  club AFC Bournemouth.

He has represented the Republic of Ireland at youth international level up until under-21 level as well as the Republic of Ireland senior team, earning his first cap in September 2019.

Club career

Early career
Travers’ first youth club was Confey in Leixlip, he then moved on to Lucan United, before spending a season at Cherry Orchard and 6 months at Shamrock Rovers.

AFC Bournemouth
Travers signed for English club AFC Bournemouth in July 2016, aged 17. He joined Weymouth on loan in August 2017, scoring on his debut. The loan ended in January 2018.

In July 2018 he signed a new "long-term" contract with Bournemouth.

He made his debut for Bournemouth on 4 May 2019 in a 1–0 win over Tottenham Hotspur. Upon doing so, he became the first teenage goalkeeper since Joe Hart in 2006 to start a Premier League match, and made a number of saves to help the club record its first ever victory over Tottenham, with Travers keeping a clean sheet and receiving Man of the Match for his performance. He was later selected by BBC pundit Garth Crooks in his 'Team of the Week'.

On 15 July 2019, Travers signed a new long term contract at Bournemouth.

He moved on loan to Swindon Town in January 2021. He was recalled by Bournemouth on 11 February 2021, having made eight appearances.

Following the departure of Asmir Begović, Travers began the 2021–22 season as Bournemouth's first choice goalkeeper, beginning with a 2–2 draw with West Brom on the opening day of the campaign. Travers started all but one of the Cherries' opening 14 games, an unbeaten run which included a club record-setting six away games in a row without conceding a goal. For his performances in September 2021, Travers was nominated for the club's player of the month award, losing out to Gary Cahill.

In June 2022 he signed a new five-year contract with Bournemouth.

International career
Travers has played for Ireland from under-15 to under-19 youth levels, and whilst a member of the under-21 team received his first call-up to the senior national team in March 2019. He was called up again to the Republic of Ireland national football team senior squad in May 2019, for Ireland's 2020 European Qualifiers against Denmark and Gibraltar.

Travers made his senior international debut on 10 September 2019, starting in a 3–1 win over Bulgaria at the Aviva Stadium.

Career statistics

International

Honours
AFC Bournemouth
Championship runner-up: 2021–22
Individual
EFL Championship Golden Glove: 2021–22
AFC Bournemouth Player of the Year: 2021–22

References

External links
Profile at the AFC Bournemouth website

1999 births
Living people
People from Maynooth
Sportspeople from County Kildare
Republic of Ireland association footballers
Association football goalkeepers
Cherry Orchard F.C. players
Shamrock Rovers F.C. players
AFC Bournemouth players
Weymouth F.C. players
Swindon Town F.C. players
Southern Football League players
Premier League players
English Football League players
Republic of Ireland youth international footballers
Republic of Ireland under-21 international footballers
Republic of Ireland international footballers